Vicki Ward (born 30 June 1969) is an Australian politician. She has been a Labor Party member of the Victorian Legislative Assembly since November 2014, representing the Legislative Assembly seat of Eltham. She has been Parliamentary Secretary for Transport since June 2020.

Ward currently sits on two Parliamentary Committees: 
 Integrity and Oversight Committee since February 2022
 Pandemic Declaration Accountability and Oversight Committee since December 2021

From 1998 to 2014, she was an advisor and electorate officer to federal Labor MP Jenny Macklin.

References

External links
 Parliamentary voting record of Vicki Ward at Victorian Parliament Tracker

1969 births
Living people
Australian Labor Party members of the Parliament of Victoria
Members of the Victorian Legislative Assembly
La Trobe University alumni
21st-century Australian politicians
Women members of the Victorian Legislative Assembly
21st-century Australian women politicians